The Iranian Sociological Association  is a non-profit and a professional organization of social scientists in Iran. Established in Tehran on 1991. The first president of the association would be Gholam-Abbas Tavassoli.

Presidents 
The following people have been presidents of the Iranian Sociological Association:
 Gholam-Abbas Tavassoli: - -2000
 Muhammad Abdollahi: 2000–2002
 Muhammad Abdollahi: 2002–2004
 Saeed Moeidfar: 2004–2006
 Saeed Moeidfar: 2006–2008
 Seyed Hossein Sirajzadeh: 2008–2010
 Mohammad Amin Ghani Rad: 2010–2013
 Mohammad Amin Ghani Rad: 2013–2016
 Seyed Hossein Sirajzadeh: 2016–2019
 Seyed Hossein Sirajzadeh: 2019–2022
 Saeed Moeidfar: 2022-2025

Specialized Magazines 
The association has several specialized journals in the field of sociological issues:
 Iranian Journal of Sociology
 Journal of Iranian Social Studies
 Iranian Political Sociology Quarterly

References

External links 
 www.isa.org.ir
 www.jsi-isa.ir
 www.jss-isa.ir

Sociological organizations